Pallavicinia is a globally distributed genus in the liverwort family Pallaviciniaceae. thallus is simple contain a strong hair like midrib. thallus area except midrib made out of one layer of cells. thallus is dark green in color and it is very small. thallus is gametophyte. it is the dominant plant. grows in shady and moist environments. thallus is green or pale green in color. 3-6cm in long and 4-5mm broad. margins are entirely or irregularly lobed. most species are distributed in tropical or sub tropical or temperate regions. can be found places like moist soil covered rocks, banks of fresh water streams. female thallus lobes with cup shaped fringed receptacles.

Species

formerly included

References

Pallaviciniales
Liverwort genera